Müller may refer to:

 Die schöne Müllerin (1823) (sometimes referred to as Müllerlieder; Müllerin is a female miller) is a song cycle with words by Wilhelm Müller and music by Franz Schubert
 Doctor Müller, fictional character in The Adventures of Tintin by Hergé
 Geiger–Müller tube, the sensing element of a Geiger counter instrument
 GMD Müller, Swiss aerial lift manufacturing company
 Müller (company), a German multinational dairy company
 Müller (footballer, born 1966), nickname of Luís Antônio Corrêa da Costa, Brazilian footballer
 Muller glia, a macroglial cell in the retina
 Müller Ltd. & Co. KG, a German pharmacy chain
 Müller (lunar crater), impact crater on the lunar surface
 Müller (Martian crater), impact crater on the Martian surface
 Müller (store), a German retail store chain
 Müller (surname), a common German surname
 Müller-Thurgau, German wine grape
 Müller Brothers, 19th-century string quartet
 Müller Milk & Ingredients, a UK milk supplier and distributor